Carl-Åke Ljung (16 August 1934 – 13 February 2023) was a Swedish sprint canoer who competed in the mid to late 1950s. He won a gold medal in the K-1 4 x 500 m event at the 1954 ICF Canoe Sprint World Championships in Mâcon. 

Ljung also competed in the K-2 1000 m event at the 1956 Summer Olympics in Melbourne, but was eliminated in the heats.

Ljung died in Västervik on 13 February 2023, at the age of 88.

References

1934 births
2023 deaths
Canoeists at the 1956 Summer Olympics
ICF Canoe Sprint World Championships medalists in kayak
Olympic canoeists of Sweden
Swedish male canoeists